František Kloz (19 May 1905 – 13 June 1945) was a Czech football player.

Club career
Kloz played most of his career for SK Kladno and became its manager in 1942-43. He scored 175 goals in 192 matches in the Czechoslovak First League (172 for Kladno, 3 for Slavia), making him the third highest scorer in the competition's history. He was twice the top goalscorer of the league, the first time in the 1929-30 season with 15 and the second in the 1936-37 season with 28 goals.

International career
He played for Czechoslovakia national team, from 1929 to 1937 - scoring six goals in 10 matches. He made his international debut on 28 October 1929 in a Friendly against Yugoslavia, and he only needed 2 minutes to leave his mark as he netted the opening goal in a 4-3 win. However, it took him 7 years to score another goal for his nation, but the wait was worth it as he scored not one, but four goals against Switzerland in a 1936–38 Central European Cup fixture. His last international goal was a late winner against Austria in 24 October 1937.

International goals
Czechoslovakia score listed first, score column indicates score after each Kloz goal.

World War II
An anti-Nazi during German occupation of Czechoslovakia in World War II, in May 1945 Kloz went out to fight as a volunteer non-soldier against German Nazi occupants. He was seriously wounded on 7 May, when his party sought to capture a German-held ammunition store two days before the enemy surrendered in Czechoslovakia. He died a month later in a hospital in Louny.

Legacy
Kloz is the most famous player in the history of SK Kladno. The team's home stadium is named after him.

References

External links 
  ČMFS entry

1905 births
1945 deaths
People from Hradec Králové District
People from the Kingdom of Bohemia
Czech footballers
Czechoslovak footballers
Czechoslovakia international footballers
SK Kladno players
SK Slavia Prague players
AC Sparta Prague players
Association football forwards
Czech resistance members
Czechoslovak civilians killed in World War II
Resistance members killed by Nazi Germany
Sportspeople from the Hradec Králové Region